Kretomino  (formerly German Krettmin) is a village in the administrative district of Gmina Manowo, within Koszalin County, West Pomeranian Voivodeship, in north-western Poland. It is located near the national road No 11, which connects Kołobrzeg and Bytom. There is a bus connection between Kretomino and the downtown Koszalin (line no 8).

For the history of the region, see History of Pomerania.

The village has a population of 410.

References

Kretomino